The 2008 Women's World Team Squash Championships is the women's edition of the 2008 World Team Squash Championships organized by the World Squash Federation, which serves as the world team championship for squash players. The event were held in Cairo, Egypt and took place from November 30 to December 6, 2008. The tournament was organized by the World Squash Federation and the Egyptian Squash Association. The Egypt team won his first World Team Championships beating the English team in the final.

Participating teams
A total of 19 teams competed from all the five confederations: Africa, America, Asia, Europe and Oceania. For China, it was their first participation at a world team championship.

Seeds

Squads

  England
 Jenny Duncalf
 Alison Waters
 Laura Lengthorn-Massaro
 Tania Bailey

  France
 Camille Serme
 Célia Allamargot
 Maud Duplomb
 Coline Aumard

  Hong Kong
 Annie Au
 Joey Chan
 Leung Shin Nga
 Liu Tsz Ling

  Spain
 Elisabet Sadó Garriga
 Xisela Aranda Núñez
 Stela Carbonell
 Alicia Alvarez Riaza

  Austria
 Birgit Coufal
 Pamela Pancis
 Sandra Polak
 Judith Gradnitzer

  Egypt
 Omneya Abdel Kawy
 Engy Kheirallah
 Raneem El Weleily
 Heba El Torky

  Australia
 Kasey Brown
 Donna Urquhart
 Lisa Camilleri
 Amelia Pittock

  Canada
 Alana Miller
 Runa Reta
 Tara Mullins
 Carolyn Russell

  Japan
 Chinatsu Matsui
 Misaki Kobayashi
 Kozue Onizawa
 Yuki Omiya

  Switzerland
 Gaby Schmohl
 Sara Guebey
 Jasmin Ballman
 Andrea Lanfranconi

  New Zealand
 Shelley Kitchen
 Jaclyn Hawkes
 Louise Crome
 Joelle King

  Ireland
 Madeline Perry
 Aisling Blake
 Laura Mylotte
 Tania Owens

  United States
 Natalie Grainger
 Claire Rein-Weston
 Olivia Blatchford
 Hope Prockop

  Italy
 Manuela Manetta
 Sonia Pasteris
 Chiara Ferrari
 Veronica Favero Camp

  China
 Wu Zhznzhen
 Jiang Li
 Xiu Chen
 Ou Wei

  Malaysia
 Nicol David
 Sharon Wee
 Delia Arnold
 Low Wee Wern

  Netherlands
 Vanessa Atkinson
 Annelize Naudé
 Orla Noom
 Dagmar Vermeulen

  Germany
 Kathrin Rohrmueller
 Pamela Hathway
 Sina Wall
 Not Used

  South Africa
 Farrah Sterne
 Diana Argyle
 Siyoli Lusaseni
 Milnay Louw

Group stage results

Pool A

Pool B

Pool C

Pool D

Finals

Draw

Results

Quarter-finals

Semi-finals

Final

Post-tournament team ranking

See also 
 World Team Squash Championships

References

External links 
Women's World Team Squash Championships 2008 SquashSite Website

World Squash Championships
Squash
W
2008 in women's squash
International sports competitions hosted by Egypt
Squash tournaments in Egypt